The Regions-Harbert Plaza is a 32-story,  office building in Birmingham, Alabama. Originally known as the AmSouth-Harbert Plaza, it was renamed on July 13, 2007, after AmSouth Bancorporation - the building's largest tenant - merged with Birmingham-based Regions Financial Corporation. Today, the  that Regions leases makes it the building's largest tenant.

History 
Designed by the architectural firm Hellmuth, Obata & Kassabaum, the Plaza was built in 1989 by general contractor Brasfield & Gorrie as a multi-tenant office building for Harbert Corporation. Harbert owned the building until 2008, when the Harbert family sold it. 

The building's base has a  retail center and its foundation can accommodate a 8-story tower above the retail area. The building also connects to the adjacent Regions Center through the mezzanine level.

Tenants 
Major tenants include Regions Financial Corporation; law firms Balch & Bingham, Waller Lansden Dortch & Davis, LLP and Maynard Cooper & Gale; an IT Professional Services Firm Insight Global, the accounting firm Ernst & Young and Northwestern Mutual. The 31st and 32nd floors contain the private City Club of Birmingham.

See also
List of tallest buildings in Birmingham, Alabama

References

External links 
 Official Website
 Emporis-Daniel Building

Skyscraper office buildings in Birmingham, Alabama
Office buildings completed in 1989
Bank buildings in Alabama
Regions Financial Corporation
1989 establishments in Alabama